Lawn Boy is the second studio album by the American rock band Phish. It was released on September 21, 1990, by Absolute A Go Go Records in the United States, with distribution by Rough Trade Records. The album was reissued on June 30, 1992, by Elektra Records.

The original Absolute A Go Go compact disc release featured "Fee" from the band's debut album Junta as a bonus track. The album was certified gold by the RIAA on July 7, 2004. The Elektra Records reissue was remastered by Bob Ludwig and does not include "Fee".

The songs on Lawn Boy include many progressive rock and fusion elements featured on the band's first studio album, Junta, as well as incorporating elements of bluegrass, jazz and barbershop quartet.

According to Phish Archivist Kevin Shapiro:

In February 2009, Lawn Boy became available as a download in FLAC and MP3 formats at LivePhish.com.

JEMP Records released Lawn Boy on Record Store Day 2013 as a Limited Edition Deluxe 2-LP vinyl set. The LE Deluxe 2-LP vinyl set was limited to 7,500 individually numbered copies and was created from the original 1/4" stereo master reels with lacquers cut by Chris Bellman at Bernie Grundman Mastering. Each LP is pressed onto 180g audiophile grade vinyl. Deluxe packaging includes an 8-page photo booklet and an etched D-side.

Track listing

Side two

Personnel
Phish:
Trey Anastasio – guitars, lead vocals, arranger
Page McConnell – piano, organ, backing vocals, co-lead vocals on "My Sweet One" and "Bouncing Around the Room", lead vocals on "Lawn Boy"
Mike Gordon – bass guitar, backing vocals, co-lead vocals on "My Sweet One" and "Bouncing Around the Room"
Jon Fishman – drums, vacuum cleaner, backing vocals

With guests on "Split Open and Melt":
Giant Country Horns:
Joseph Sommerville, Jr. – trumpet
Dave "The Truth" Grippo – alto saxophone
Russell B. Remington – tenor saxophone
Christine Lynch – vocals

Notes

External links
 Phish's Official Site
 Phish.com: Lawn Boy Album Page

1990 albums
Phish albums
LivePhish.com Downloads